Hari Prasad Rimal (Nepali: हरि प्रसाद रिमाल, born September 20, 1925; died August 31, 2018 ) sometimes known as, father of Nepali Radio drama was a Nepalese actor, singer and film director. He is known for being the first person to sing on Radio Nepal and he has acted on Nepal's first film Aama.

Rimal recorded "Mann Tukra Bhayera Aakhaako Baato Bahanechha" written by Shankar Lamichhane on Radio Nepal in 1950/51 and became first person ever singer of Radio Nepal. Rimal has appeared in many Nepalese movies including Aama, Man Ko Bandh, K Ghar Ke Dera and among others.

Personal life 
Rimal was born on September 20, 1925 in Lagantole, Lalitpur, Nepal. He was the third child to Ghana Shyam Rimal and Mohan Kumari Rimal. His father was known for his singing abilities and his brothers were poets. Rimal died on August 31, 2018 in Baneshwor, Kathmandu at age 93. Before his death he was suffering from lungs infection.

Filmography

Awards 

 Bhakta Raj Acharya Pratishthan (honour)

References 

1925 births
2018 deaths
20th-century Nepalese male actors
People from Lalitpur District, Nepal
Nepalese male comedians
Nepalese film directors
Nepalese male film actors
20th-century Nepalese male singers
Nepalese male television actors
Nepalese male writers
Durbar High School alumni